Lew Temple (born October 2, 1967) is an American actor, known for his roles as Locus Fender in the action film, Domino, Cal, the diner manager in the comedy-drama Waitress, and Axel in the third season of The Walking Dead.

Early life
Temple was raised in Texas. He was the 1982 Baseball MVP at Rollins College, and graduated in 1985.

Career

Baseball
Though he was too small for the big leagues, he continued with his love for baseball, snagging roles as a minor league bullpen catcher for the Seattle Mariners and Houston Astros. In 1986, he was a scout for the New York Mets, and would later go on to serve as Assistant Director of Minor League Operations and Scouting for the Astros until 1993.

Acting

Film
Temple has had several film roles in the horror genre, appearing in Rob Zombie's horror film, The Devils Rejects as Adam Banjo, portraying Sheriff Hoyt in the prequel to the remake of The Texas Chain Saw Massacre and as Noel Kluggs in Rob Zombie's slasher film, Halloween. Temple played Marv in Trailer Park of Terror, and Pete in the thriller/horror film House. In 2016 he starred in Rob Zombie Slasher film 31 as Psycho-Head.

Temple's other film roles include Locus Fender in the action film Domino, a paramedic in the crime thriller Déjà Vu, Cal, the diner manager in the comedy-drama Waitress, Brian LaRue in a proof of concept for the science-fiction film The Three, Ned in the thriller Unstoppable and Montgomery Blair, a member of Abraham Lincoln's Cabinet, in the movie Saving Lincoln, which tells the President's story through the eyes of Ward Hill Lamon, a former law partner, friend, and primary bodyguard.

Television
Temple appeared in an episode of CSI: Miami as Billy Chadwick, a local loner in a grizzly bear murder case. In 2010, he appeared in an episode of NCIS: Los Angeles as Mr. Loobertz, and in 2011 he appeared in an episode of Criminal Minds, in which he played a former fisherman turned part-time deliveryman called Bill Thomas, who kidnaps Alison Sparks.

His most notable television role was on The Walking Dead as Axel, a prisoner survivor of the zombie apocalypse.

Awards

In 2015 Temple received a Lifetime Achievement Award from the Annual Gulf Coast Film and Video Festival. The award is given to a distinguished actor recognized for his continuing work in the industry of film and video.

Personal life
In 2002, Temple was let go from a movie contract because he dismissed symptoms of a serious illness. A near-death experience resulted in an examination at M.D. Anderson Hospital in Houston, where he was diagnosed with a rare form of leukemia and a forty percent chance of survival. He stayed in the hospital for eight months and underwent chemotherapy treatment. He is a leukemia survivor.

In 2009, Temple was involved in a charity event for breast cancer called Bowling for Boobies.

Filmography

Film

Television

Video games

References

Further reading

External links

 
 

1967 births
American male film actors
American male television actors
Living people
Rollins College alumni
Male actors from Texas
20th-century American male actors
21st-century American male actors
American people of English descent